Wilson Hermosa González (1 June 1943 – 12 February 2008) was a Bolivian musician and composer, born near Capinota, in the department of Cochabamba.

Along with his brothers Castel and Gonzalo, and Edgar Villarroel, on 23 June 1971 he founded the Los Kjarkas musical group, which subsequently enjoyed both national and international fame. 

Wilson Hermosa's speciality were string instruments, in particular the charango.

He died on 12 February 2008 in Cochabamba after suffering a stroke.

External links
Website of Los Kjarkas
Muere el fundador del emblemático grupo de música andina "Los Kjarkas" (Los Tiempos)

1944 births
2008 deaths
People from Cochabamba Department
Bolivian musicians